Gainesville is a census-designated place (CDP) in western Prince William County, Virginia, United States. The population was 17,287 in the 2020 census.

History 
Gainesville was once a changing point for stagecoach horses on the Fauquier & Alexandria Turnpike. In earlier times, the village that became known as “Gainesville” actually had two other names, if only briefly. In colonial days, the region was known as the “Middle Grounds,” in reference to its location between Broad Run and Bull Run. In the early 1800s, Samuel Love of Buckland Hall started work on the Warrenton-Alexandria Turnpike. In the hamlet where the turnpike passed through the Middle Grounds, a new stable was erected for stagecoach drivers to switch horses. Other businesses followed, and the settlement became known as New Stable. In 1846, a post office by that name was opened there in Richard Graham's hotel and store. Mr. Graham also operated a large stable that catered to the drovers and stage drivers and other less pretentious travelers. The person responsible for bringing the railroad through the village was Thomas Brawner Gaines (1814-1856), who had begun buying up property in the area as early as 1835, and later became a major landowner.

In 1850, Thomas Brawner Gaines (1814-1856) sold to the Manassas Gap Railroad a right-of-way through his land along the Warrenton Turnpike (US Route 29). After the railroad was completed to Strasburg, Virginia in 1854, Gaines conveyed additional land for a train depot with the condition that the rail stop take his name. By 1856, a small community with a post office flourished around the Gainesville depot.

Gainesville became a shipping point for grain, timber, and cattle and remained a major cattle shipping point into the early 1960s. During the American Civil War, Gainesville was occupied by both Confederate and Union armies and nearby Thoroughfare Gap in the Bull Run Mountains served as a path for soldiers to reach the First and Second battles of Bull Run. Into the early 1940s the Southern Railway operated passenger service from Harrisonburg and Strasburg Junction through Gainesville, to Manassas and Washington's Union Station. In 1994, the groundbreaking for Gainesville's first townhome community began; it was named Crossroads.  This marked the beginning of mass-development for Gainesville.

In 2006, the VDOT began working on the Gainesville Interchange improvement project, with construction officially starting in July 2011, in order to ease the traffic in the rapidly growing Gainesville-Haymarket area. It was completed on July 9, 2015.

Geography
Gainesville is located at  (38.794784, −77.620651).

According to the United States Census Bureau, the CDP has a total area of 10.3 square miles (26.6 km2), of which 9.7 square miles (25.2 km2) is land and 0.6 square mile (1.5 km2) (5.45%) is water.

Climate
Gainesville has a humid subtropical climate (Köppen climate classification Cfa), with mild winters with brief cold snaps, and hot and humid summers with frequent thunderstorms. Spring and autumn are pleasantly warm. January is the coldest month with highs around 45 °F and lows around 25 °F. July is the warmest month, with highs around 90 °F and lows around 65 °F.

Demographics

Gainesville is currently the third-largest CDP in Prince William County. At the 2010 census, there were 11,481 people, 3,959 households and roughly 3,100 families living in the CDP.

At the 2000 census, there were 4,383 people, 1,719 households, and 1,304 families living in the CDPhe racial makeup of the CDP was 88.77% White, 6.80% African American, 0.23% Native American, 1.37% Asian, 0.05% Pacific Islander, 1.53% from other races, and 1.26% from two or more races. Hispanic or Latino of any race were 3.77% of the population.

There were 10,300 households, of which 32.8% had children under the age of 18 living with them, 67.2% were married couples living together, 5.6% had a female householder with no husband present, and 24.1% were non-families. 18.6% of all households were made up of individuals, and 3.8% had someone living alone who was 65 years of age or older. The average household size was 2.55 and the average family size was 2.91.

24.4% of the population were under the age of 18, 5.2% from 18 to 24, 36.7% from 25 to 44, 23.6% from 45 to 64, and 9.9% who were 65 years of age or older. The median age was 36 years. For every 100 females, there were 97.4 males. For every 100 females age 18 and over, there were 94.8 males.

The median household income was $76,300 and the median family income was $82,627. Males had a median income of $46,934 and females $40,385. The per capita income was $35,196. About 1.9% of families and 2.8% of the population were below the poverty line, including 3.7% of those under age 18 and 0.6% of those age 65 or over.

Danica Roem represents Gainesville in the Virginia House of Delegates.

Development
Major commercial and residential development has taken place since 2000, resulting in Gainesville having six large shopping centers.  The intersection of I-66 and Lee Highway (29 Highway) has the largest shopping center with big box stores, such as Target Supercenter, Lowe's, Best Buy, DSW, Walgreens, and many other stores and restaurants.  Somerset Crossing has a Bank of America, Wells Fargo, and other shops.  Close to US-15 are a Staples, Ross, Wegmans Food Markets, Michael's, and Harris Teeter. The Promenade at Virginia Gateway was developed by The Peterson Companies, including BJ's Warehouse, which opened in January 2012, and Regal Theaters which opened in late 2013.

A proposed Haymarket / Gainesville railway station extension for the VRE was scheduled to open in 2022, connecting the region via commuter rail to Fairfax County, Manassas, and Washington, D.C. However the project was voted down by the VRE Operations Board, in favor of expanding services to the existing station in Broad Run.

References

External links

 Official Website of Prince William County
 Gainesville, VA area Senior Living Communities

Census-designated places in Prince William County, Virginia
Census-designated places in Virginia
Washington metropolitan area